The City of Youth is a 1928 British silent drama film directed by E. H. Calvert and starring Betty Faire, Lilian Oldland and J. Fisher White.

Cast
 Betty Faire as Barbara  
 Lilian Oldland as Brownie  
 J. Fisher White as Patrick Enderby  
 Desmond Roberts

References

Bibliography
 Wood, Linda. British Films, 1927-1939. British Film Institute, 1986.

External links
 

1928 films
1928 drama films
British black-and-white films
British drama films
British silent films
Films directed by E. H. Calvert
1920s English-language films
1920s British films
Silent drama films